An Open Value Network (OVN) is a new organizational framework designed to support commons-based peer production. Inspired by the value network concept introduced by Verna Allee. 
This organization is by nature and from birth transnational (i.e. operating beyond the influence of states).

OVNs rely on technology (digital infrastructures) to support their operations. They have no (or very few) formal mechanisms of power to allow centralization of control over the platform (the technological infrastructure) that enables the activities of the network, although it is evident that they exhibit informal power structures. Examples are Bitcoin, Ethereum, Sensorica, etc.

Background

The model was first proposed, developed and implemented by Sensorica affiliates. Sensorica was created in February 2011. Initially, the model evolved from the Discovery Network model proposed by Sensorica's co-founder Tibi between, 2008 and 2010. Between 2011 and 2012, the model drew from the work of Verna Allee, Yochai Benkler, Michel Bauwens, Clay Shirky, and others. After the summer of 2012, the network resource planning and contribution accounting system (NRP-CAS) was influenced by Bob Haugen, who has been developing enterprise resource planning systems (ERP) since 1995. From May 2013 to May 2014, Yasir worked on a framework for open value network in collaboration with other Sensorica affiliates. The OVN model was extended to network of networks, in the context of the Open Alliance initiative also lead by Sensorica, an attempt to federate fablabs and makerspaces in Montreal, Canada. 

The OVN work has input directly into international ISO standards development, namely, ISO/IEC 15944-15 "Information technology - Business Operational View - Part 15: Open Value Networks(OVN): Integrated perspective on Open-edi, eBusiness, blockchain and distributed transactions". The lead international ISO Project Editor : Prof. William McCarthy, with Jake Knoppers as one of two Co-Project Editors. The international ISO standards committee responsible here is ISO/IEC JTC1/SC32/WG1 (where JTC1 = Joint ISO, IEC = Technical Committee on Information technology, SC = Data Management & Interchange, WG1 = eBusiness)

Main characteristics
 Openness: barrier to entry for participation, access to resources
 Transparency: access given to the public to information, processes
 Reliability: defines the reliability of the network components and the connectivity between them. Mean time between failures (MTBF) is commonly used to measure reliability.
 Resilience: includes the protection of the network components and the data/information they contain and/or the data transmitted between them.
 Scalability: defines how well the network can adapt to new growth, including new users, applications, and network components.
 Topology: describes the physical layout and the logical way data and information moves between functional components.
 Adaptability: describes how well the network responds to changes in the environment
 Vitality: degree of activity, degree of involvement of participants
 Sustainability: describes how well resources are managed

Production
Production is almost entirely crowdsourced. It feeds on collective/social intelligence, i.e. relies on crowdthinking processes. Central planning is replaced with stigmergy. 
Commons-based peer production means that the knowledge used in co-creating artifacts is openly shared under some type of open source licence. 
Production is incentivised by allocating benefits to all participants, based on their contributions.

See also
 Distributed autonomous organization or DAO

External links

 Blockchain Value Networks; 2019 IEEE Social Implications of Technology (SIT) and Information Management (SITIM)
Reimagining New Socio-Technical Economics Through the Application of Distributed Ledger Technologies
From Open Innovation to Crowd Sourcing: A New Configuration of Collaborative Work? Diane-Gabrielle Tremblay, Amina Yagoubi, American Journal of Industrial and Business Management, 2017, 7, 223-244
Democratising Design in Scientific Innovation: Application of an Open Value Network to Open Source Hardware Design; Cumulus Working Papers 33/16: Cumulus Hong Kong 2016 – Open Design for E-very-thing, pp. 333-339.
Re-imagining Value: Insights from the Care Economy, Commons, Cyberspace and Nature
Peer to Peer: The Commons Manifesto
Value in the commons economy: Developments in open and contributory value accounting

Blockchains
Distributed computing
Consensus